Son preference in China is a gender preference issue. Preference of sons can be explained by an attitude: a belief that boys have more value than girls; it can be defined as a gender bias as well. This phenomenon in China can be shown in gender sex ratio. The financial support that parents receive after their child's marriage is significantly affected by their child's gender. This can be one of the reasons that Chinese parents are more willing to have a son. Furthermore, Chinese agrarian society influences sex preference deeply as well. It is obvious that agriculture needs physical strength in a primitive agricultural society. Thus, the long run agriculture society in China can explain this phenomenon. Although the Chinese patriarchal thinking can be traced back thousands of years, with the development of the Chinese economy, this concept potential gradually disintegrates.

History 

The origin of Chinese son preference can be related to the beginning of Chinese patriarchic society. Agriculture can be a key to understand the Chinese son preference history. For thousands of years in China, most of the Chinese preferred sons rather than daughters because majority of males have more ability to earn more than girls, especially in agrarian economies. When human society enters the patriarchal society from the matriarchal society, men gradually occupy a dominant position in social production. People cannot leave men in hunting, animal husbandry, plowing or even snoring. In most of the religious aspects, males can continue the family line; in financial factor, most of the Chinese older generation believe that girls typically have no responsibility for their parents when they marry. The ethical thoughts of male superiority and female sorrow have existed in the patriarchal society. With the development of feudal ethics, this viewpoint has gradually developed and deepened into the hearts of the people.

Sex selection was operated through ultrasound screenings and abortions during the 1980s and 1990s, but laws and regulations enacted since 2001 have forbidden hospitals from carrying out the procedure.

Reasons

Agrarian society 
The agrarian society is based on producing and maintaining crops and farmland. Agrarian society in China is one of the factors that impact Chinese son preference. Before the globalisation, during Song, Ming and Qing dynasty, China was trapped in an agrarian society period. Obviously, the majority of works in agriculture must utilize males’ strength. Although the expansionary of urbanisation has increased in recent decades in China, agriculture still has impact on gender bias in this country. The Chinese social culture cannot be changed easily. Despite the fact that China has developed its economics rapidly, majority of farmers who move from rural area to urban city still hold the son preference value; in Chinese social culture, sons should take more responsibility to take on households.

Financial security 
Financial security is a reason that affects sex preference in China. In Chinese social culture, in older generation concepts, once a girl is married with her husband, she will belong to the husbands family, which means she will not have the responsibility to take care of her parents anymore; thus, their parents will have worried who can take care of them if their daughter got married. In general, the majority of traditional Chinese societies culture concept believes that sons can take responsibility for their family, instead of girls. In other words, traditionally, the blood of the family has been inherited by the male side. After the woman married, she joined her husbands family and took care of her in-laws rather than her parents. For a long period of time, "nurturing children to prevent old age" is the iron law of people's trust. In contrast, from several Chinese opinions, raising a daughter becomes a waste. Some Chinese Sociologists even point out from the perspective of society, it is not rational to be patriarchal, but for individuals, this is still a wise choice. In recent years, Chinese population became larger. Therefore, Chinese government advanced the 'one child policy' in order to dominate the large population in 1979. With the developing technology, Chinese parents may know their childs sex, they potentially use the sex-selection abortion to make sure they have boys. In Chinese older generations opinions, they potentially will get financial support even if their sons are getting married.

Traditional Chinese folk religion 

Son preference in rural China has some affect by traditional Chinese folk religion. Such folk religion may overlap with an individual's belief in Buddhism, Taoism, Confucianism, or other traditional Chinese religions. It is widely known that the majority of Chinese hold Confucianism as their core value religion in ancient China; patriarchy is a part of value included by Confucianism. In general, the preference of son basically is strongly command in country which holds Confucianism. Confucianism brings a heavy burden on Chinese women. In Chinese traditional Confucian families, husband and other family members have more status than wives. Chinese wives paramount responsibility is to look after and serve the household, including to do all the housework. Furthermore, ancestor worship is underlined by Chinese folk religion as well. Besides, Chinese ancestor worship emphasizes the filial piety. One of the filial method is to continue the family line in China. Passing on the genealogy is one of the method to continue the family. However, in Chinese old generation concepts, family’s genealogy will be interrupted if they do not have sons. Moreover, the inability to bear a son can become a potential factor for divorce for some couples.

Consequences 
The sex ratio of birth (SRB) is defined as the ratio of the new born male infants to every 100 girls. It is demonstrated that China has always reported high SRBs during the past decades because of the effect of preference to sons, and there would possibly be a lack of women in the whole society of China for next 20 years, as a shortage of women was estimated to be faced. Interestingly, people in China who are unable to be married or single for a long time are generally called 'guang gun (single)', meaning 'bare branches'. According to the reality of male excess female, majority of consequences can be assumed. Firstly, the sexual frustration and psychosocial vulnerability may come together to these males and let them become violent and aggressive. To be clear, the reason is that they can’t through achieve marriage and bear a child to meet the Chinese traditional expectations. Although it just a consumption, this prediction has a good empirical to support: the cross-culture evidences illustrate that majority of criminal planner and murderers were low status and unmarried males. They may turn to anti-social organizations, threatening social stability and security, since they do not behave in current social order. Therefore, male surplus is a trepidation issues which should be concerned. Nevertheless, the evidence is not strong enough to proof the prediction that they are prone on crime though majority of the unmated males are easy to tend to become depression. Furthermore, excess male has stimulate the phonograph industry as well. Majority of data illustrate that the sex industry is experiencing expansionary in current decades. However, the consequence of increasing the sex workers as increasing sex ratio can’t be proved. According to some research, the main reason for increasing the sex workers in China can be related to Chinese domestic socioeconomic inequality.

Some positive consequence may affect since high sex ratio on marriage of males in China. Basically, the women status will develop gradually. Clearly, the sex preference may rise the Fertility needs. The mortality rate of girls will decrease as gender discrimination decreases. Minority of article argues that sex imbalance is a way to control Chinese large population. Furthermore, with the decreasing number of women in society, their value will be increased. Thus, their status increases as well. Developing the woman status may let son preference decreased potentially. The issue of women’s rights and patriarchal issues has also become a major concern of the representatives of the Chinese National Committees in 2017. In recent years, the Chinese government has always attached great importance to the rights and interests of women, especially the series of targeted measures taken in recent years to significantly improve the status of women.

Chinese one-child policy 

The Chinese one-child policy (instituted from 1979 to 2016) contributed to sex imbalance in China as well. The policy penalized families who had more than one child. The original intention of this policy was to control the growth rate of Chinese large population. Although this policy was introduced as a long term and temporary policy and aimed to reduce the number of family members, this measure was not uniform to some extent. In the early 1980s, the sex ratio of births was 108 (the ratio of male to female was 108:100), slightly higher than the natural level; by 2000, this number had risen to 120, with some provinces such as Anhui, Jiangxi, and Shaanxi reaching 130. Compared to the natural level, this meant 35 million fewer girls were born than would be biologically expected. Although countries like India face similar imbalances, China's gap is the largest, mostly due to the one child policy.

The Chinese government tried to counteract these developments by compensating families who only had a girl and, in some rural areas, allowing them to have a second child if the first was a girl. This however led to further reinforcement of the idea that boys were more valuable.

Reactions 
The United Nations proposes improvements in gender equality in China. Son preference in China has also attracted social or international attention. The gender imbalance in Chinese-born babies is a problem that has plagued China in recent years, and has been a concern of the UN Committee on the Elimination of Discrimination against Women. In the conclusion, the Commission made some constructive suggestions. The Committee recommends that China conduct compulsory gender equality education for family planning officials and recommend that China address the tendency to be patriarchal in rural areas and address the root causes of patriarchal attitudes in rural areas. To solve the negative consequences of the one-child policy, the specific recommendations of this committee is to expand the benefit of public in rural areas, especially rural women, by expanding the insurance system and pensions in China. In addition, with efforts of various government departments in China, nowadays, more people can treat boys and girls equally.

References 

Childhood in China
Confucian rites
Patriarchy
Sex selection in China